Mounce is an unincorporated community in Dent County, in the U.S. state of Missouri.

History
A post office called Mounce was established in 1892, and remained in operation until 1913. The community has the name of Prince E. Mounce, an early citizen.

References

Unincorporated communities in Dent County, Missouri
Unincorporated communities in Missouri